Deltoid tubercle may refer to:
 Deltoid tubercle of spine of scapula
 Deltoid tuberosity of humerus
 Deltoid tubercle of clavicle